National Intelligence Centre may refer to:

 National Intelligence Centre (Mexico)
 National Intelligence Centre (Spain)